The 1968 Dunedin mayoral election was part of the New Zealand local elections held that same year. In 1968, elections were held for the Mayor of Dunedin plus other local government positions including twelve city councillors. The polling was conducted using the standard first-past-the-post electoral method.

Russell Calvert, the incumbent Mayor, was defeated running for a second term by Citizens' city councillor Jim Barnes. The Citizens' Association increased their representation, winning eight seats on the city council to the Labour Party's four.

Results
The following table shows the results for the election:

References

Mayoral elections in Dunedin
Dunedin
Politics of Dunedin
1960s in Dunedin
October 1968 events in New Zealand